Anatole de Monzie (22 November 1876, Bazas, Gironde – 11 January 1947, Paris) was a French administrator, encyclopaedist (Encyclopédie française), political figure and scholar. His father was a tax collector in Bazas, Gironde where Anatole – a name he disliked from an early age – was born in 1876. A nurse mishap resulted in an accident where the infant Anatole lost the proper use of his leg and he remained crippled for the rest of his life. He never married but had several relationships. A brilliant mind, he studied in Agen before attending the Collège Stanislas, a famous Roman Catholic school in Paris, where he became friend with writer to be Henry de Jouvenel and Roman Catholic activist Marc Sangnier.

Career
He studied law and started to practice but finally chose politics. He was chef de cabinet of education minister Joseph Chautemps in 1902. At about the same time, he started a career as a local politician in the Lot, a forlorn and backwater, yet charming, department in the south west of France. Successively, and very often simultaneously, he became counsellor, general, mayor of Cahors (the local prefecture), deputy and senator. Soon commanding a huge following among the local voters, pleased by his culture, his easy access to government and proficiency in handing out public sector jobs, he made of the Lot a lifelong stronghold.

Member of a small centrist faction, called Républicains Socialistes, he soon cut a fine figure in the Chambre des Députés because of its abilities and its central positioning. His thriving ministerial career started in 1913 when he was appointed sous-secrétaire d'État à la marine marchande. From 1918 to 1940, he occupied numerous positions in all sorts of governments and was appointed minister eighteen times.  
 
As a finance minister, he is remembered for recommending to cut the budget in 1925. He was deeply involved in diplomatic affairs, starting a campaign for a renewal of the relations with the Holy See followed, in 1922, by a plea for the acknowledgment of the Soviet Union.
From 1924 to 1927, he headed the Russian Affairs Commission and as such dealt with some of the prominent Russian figures of that time. He started discussing the reimbursement of the Russian loans but, after the return to power of Poincaré in 1926, the negotiation failed.

In 1925, he also served briefly as Minister of Education and Fine Arts. He is credited for introducing philosophy in the high school curriculum, perhaps a reflect of his masonic affiliation. He also banned the teaching of local dialects or languages in school – for instance, declaring in 1927 that "for the linguistic unity of France, the Breton language must disappear". During a new stint as Minister of Education in the government of Édouard Herriot in 1932, the name of the department was changed to Éducation nationale, a name it has kept hitherto. His policy generally promoted a free and neutral education system.

Minister of Travaux publics in 1938, he was confronted to a great dockers strike, which enhanced the Left distrust for his person. Between 1938 and 1940, he led several diplomatic missions. During that time of international tensions, Anatole's position was a matter of controversy. A stalwart pacifist, he was indeed actively promoting a Latin alliance between France and Italy who would mediate between Hitler and the Allies.

He voted to assent governmental powers to Maréchal Pétain in 1940. Being a friend of Otto Abetz, Darquier de Pellepoix and Fernand de Brinon, he was nonetheless an object of hatred for many among the Vichy regime. He was forced to resign from his mayorship in 1942. Indicted by the Comité national des écrivains (National Writers' Committee) in 1945, he died in Paris two years later.

Anatole de Monzie was a scholar and something of a writer. His intellectual legacy numbers the publication of the Encyclopédie française from 1935 on. He was also connected to various French writers and intellectuals of the time, including Colette, Roland Dorgelès, Lucien Febvre and Pierre Benoit, whom he introduced to the Lot, especially the little town of Saint-Céré, where the writer wrote several of his works. Despite his achievements, however, his legacy will be forever tainted by his genocidal opposition to Breton culture.

Works of Anatole de Monzie

Les Réformes scolaires, Paris, Stock, 1905
Aux confins de la politique, Paris, Grasset, 1913
Si resucitara !, Paris, Alcan, 1915 (sur les relations Franco-espagnoles)
Rome sans Canossa, ou la diplomatie de la présence, Paris, Albin Michel, 1918
L'entrée au forum : vingt ans avant, Paris, Albin Michel, 1920
La Mort de Julie, Paris, Auguste Blaizot, 1922
Du Kremlin au Luxembourg, Paris, Delpuech, 1924
Les Contes de Saint-Céré, Paris, Gallimard, 1929
Grandeur et servitude judiciaires, Paris, Kra, 1931
Petit manuel de la Russie nouvelle, Paris, Firmin-Didot, 1931
Livre d'oraisons, Paris, Excelsior, 1934
Les Veuves abusives, Paris, Grasset, 1937
Ci-devant, Paris, Flammarion, 1941
Pétition pour l'histoire, Paris, Flammarion, 1942
Mémoires de la tribune, Paris, Correa, 1943
La Saison des juges, Paris, Flammarion, 1943
Le Conservatoire du peuple, Paris, Société d'Édition d'enseignement supérieur, 1948

References

Guillaume Lagane, Anatole de Monzie et les élections de 1936, Mémoire de Sciences Po Paris, 1992

1876 births
1947 deaths
People from Gironde
Politicians from Nouvelle-Aquitaine
Republican-Socialist Party politicians
French Socialist Party (1919) politicians
Socialist Republican Union politicians
Transport ministers of France
French Ministers of National Education
French Ministers of Finance
Members of the 9th Chamber of Deputies of the French Third Republic
Members of the 10th Chamber of Deputies of the French Third Republic
Members of the 11th Chamber of Deputies of the French Third Republic
French Senators of the Third Republic
Senators of Lot (department)
Members of the 14th Chamber of Deputies of the French Third Republic
Members of the 15th Chamber of Deputies of the French Third Republic
Members of the 16th Chamber of Deputies of the French Third Republic
Collège Stanislas de Paris alumni